The Unfaithful Wife is a 1969 French crime thriller film directed by Claude Chabrol. The film had a total of 682,295 admissions in France.

Plot
Insurer Charles Desvallées lives in a beautiful house in the countryside near Paris with his wife Hélène and their young son. He works in the city in a leisurely job, often drinking and smoking. His wife often goes to Paris for shopping, beauty treatments and cinema sessions.

By accident he discovers she was not at the hairdresser when she was meant to be. He gradually grows more suspicious about the way she employs her time and asks a private investigator to follow her.  The embarrassed detective duly reports that his wife sees a writer called Victor Pégala, at his home in Neuilly-sur-Seine, several times a week.  Hélène appears in bed with Pégala, exchanging titbits about their respective lives. The writer is divorced with two children.

On a day his wife is busy hosting a birthday party for their son, Desvallées pays Pégala a visit.  At first he tells the confused writer jovially that he and his wife have an open marriage and sits and talks pleasantly with him. He asks for a tour of the small flat. On seeing the bed his demeanour changes, as he pictures his wife there. He spots a giant cigarette lighter at the bedside. This had been a 3rd anniversary present to his wife from him. He starts to feel unwell and suddenly grabs a stone bust and kills Pégala with a violent blow to the head.

Desvallée calms down and meticulously cleans up and removes all fingerprints. He then brings his car round near the back gate,  bundles up the body, and drags it in broad daylight but in a quiet neighbourhood to the car, where he stuffs it in the boot.

En route he is rear-ended by a van after braking distractedly.  Desvallée nearly panics and hurries the formalities with the other driver as a crowd assembles and a policeman remarks that his boot is now jammed.  He dumps the body into a murky pond where it takes an agonisingly long time to sink.

A day or two later, Hélène is grumpy and unwell.  Two detectives turn up in the daytime to interrogate her about Victor Pégala, who has been reported missing by his ex-wife.  They have found her name and details in the missing man's address book. She is flustered and avoids giving direct answers as to how she knew Victor.  In the evening, she mentions the disappearance to her husband, claiming Pégala was only a vague acquaintance.  The detectives return and interrogate both Hélène and Charles, who denies having even heard of the man before.

Hélène finds a photograph of Victor in her husband's jacket pocket with his name and address on the back. She looks as if she is going to confront him but she goes outside and burns it. Her emotions are difficult to read.

In the final scene the family is in their garden when the two policemen walk up the drive. Charles tells Hélène that he "loves her madly" and goes to speak to the police.  The camera then moves back to the wife and child, slowly panning until they disappear hidden by soft focus foliage as Charles is presumably taken away from them.

Cast
 Stéphane Audran as Hélène Desvallées
 Michel Bouquet as Charles Desvallées
 Michel Duchaussoy as Inspector Duval
 Maurice Ronet as Victor Pegala
 Louise Chevalier as maid
 Louise Rioton as Mamy
 Serge Bento as Bignon
 Henri Marteau as Paul
 Guy Marley as Police Officer Gobet
 François Moro-Giafferi as Frederic
 Albert Minski as King Club owner
 Dominique Zardi as truck driver
 Michel Charell as policeman
 Henri Attal as man in cafe
 Jean Marie-Arnoux as false witness
 Stéphane di Napoli as Michel Desvallées
 Donatella Turri as Brigitte

Reception
The film was commercially unsuccessful in France (only 682,295 admissions) but was praised by critics. The New York Times said that "in concept and execution, it is a film so calmly and thoughtfully perverse that it can have been born only in the unique cinematic imagination of Claude Chabrol." Time Out called it "one of Chabrol's mid-period masterpieces, a brilliantly ambivalent scrutiny of bourgeois marriage and murder." Derek Malcolm wrote in The Guardian that "Chabrol displays an irrestistible logic and an ironic humour", and "what could have been just another thriller becomes... also a passionate love story, with its share of intense irony and a pervading sense of the quirkiness of fate." TV Guide called it "arguably the best of Chabrol's superb, Hitchcockian studies of guilt, love, and murder among the French elite", and said that "Michel Bouquet and Stéphane Audran... give perhaps the finest performances of their careers."

Remakes
It was remade in Filipino in 1995 as Sa ngalan ng pag-ibig and in English in 2002 as Unfaithful, directed by Adrian Lyne.

It unofficially was remade in India in 2004 as Murder, directed by Anurag Basu.

It was remade in Lebanon in 2014 as series « IF لو ».

References

External links
 
 

1968 films
Adultery in films
French crime drama films
1968 crime drama films
Films about infidelity
French neo-noir films
Films directed by Claude Chabrol
1969 drama films
1969 films
1960s French films